María Cristina Rubio Ponce de León (known as Maricris Rubio, born 1978 in Trujillo)  is a Peruvian model.

As a teenager, Rubio was "Queen of Spring" in Trujillo, and later on, Miss La Libertad and also Miss Hawaiian Tropic Peru. She has worked for modeling agencies in Mexico and the United States, where she has appeared as an extra in the video clip of Slash. After being on the models staff of the TV show Habacilar, had its first appearance as an actress in the television series Al fondo hay sitio as Renata, during the third season.

Filmography 
Habacilar (2010) Model.
Al fondo hay sitio (2011) as Renata Newman.

See also
Trujillo Spring Festival
Miss La Libertad

References
In Spanish:

External links

People from Trujillo, Peru
Peruvian female models
Peruvian television actresses
Peruvian people of Spanish descent
1978 births
Living people
21st-century Peruvian actresses